Véronique Schiltz (23 December 1942, Châteauroux – 4 February 2019, Paris) was a French archaeologist, historian of art, and literary translator. She was a specialist in steppes art, in particular that of the Scythians, concentrating on the history and culture of steppe peoples between the first millennium BCE and the first millennium CE. She was a member of the Académie des Inscriptions et Belles-Lettres from 2011, and an Officer of the Legion of Honour.

Life
Véronique Schiltz was born in 1942. Her father was a headmaster of the Lycée Louis-le-Grand. She attended the École normale supérieure (Paris), where besides ancient languages she also studied Russian.

Schiltz obtained a secondary teaching licence, the Agrégation de Lettres classiques, in 1964. In 1995, she defended her doctoral thesis (Origines et évolution des formes traditionnelles de l'art des steppes dans l'Antiquité) at the École pratique des hautes études.

Schiltz died in Paris on 4 February 2019. A memorial to her was held at the Anna Akhmatova Literary and Memorial Museum in Saint Petersburg on 14 February 2019.

Career
Schiltz taught at the Lycée des Pontonniers in Strasbourg between 1964–1965, after which she moved to Moscow, where she taught French literature and culture at the Moscow State University till 1967.

She held various positions including the directorship of the archaeology and history of art departments of the University of Franche-Comté between 1967–2000. She was course director of ancient iconography and the art of the Near East at the Sorbonne from 1981 to 1987.

Schiltz curated several exhibitions on steppes art, notably Or des Scythes at the Grand Palais, Paris in 1975, and L'Or des cavaliers thraces at the Palais de la Civilisation, Montreal in 1987. In 2001, she organised an exhibition L'or des Amazones at the Musée Cernuschi, Paris, of bronzes, gold and silver crafts and ceramics of the nomadic tribes of the Don and Azov basins.

Archaeology
During her sojourn in the Soviet Union, Schiltz was able to access archaeological and archive materiel sourced between the Black Sea and the frontier with Mongolia. As a philologist and historian of art, she established a school for ancient nomadic cultures at Besançon's University of Franche-Comté.

Schiltz synthesised the varied cultural artefacts of the Scythians into a coherent paradigm. She showed that, despite their not leaving behind architectural or literary traces, their funerary customs illumined their world view. Their art comprised not only animal-like figures but also fantastic chimeras; their burial mounds contained weapons and toiletry as well as ceramics. The extent of the Scythian world, from the Crimea to the Yenisei river valley – across nearly 4000 km – showed a community of culture, both in space and in time. Schiltz was able to demonstrate that the melded animal figurines were not merely imaginative productions but an encoding of their beliefs.

Translations
Schiltz met the Russian poet Joseph Brodsky in the Soviet Union and became a close friend. She would become a promoter of his works in France, translating several of his books. She was a translator for the radio station France Culture.

Brodsky's meditative poem Adieu, Mademoiselle Véronique is addressed to her. Schiltz translated other Russian authors of his generation, including Natalya Gorbanevskaya.

Schiltz also translated several academic and art history texts from the Russian, often publishing them under various pseudonyms. For instance, the preface to her translation of Mikhail Allenov on the art of the 19th century (L'art Russe, 1991) was written under the name of Catherine Astroff, while the main text was in her own name.

Schiltz's last publication was that of the short stories of Grigori Gorin titled The Very Truthful on Baron Munchausen. She had translated these much earlier in her career but published them only a few days before her death.

Art history
In 1998, Schiltz organised an exhibition at the Abbaye aux Dames in Caen on Russian avant-garde art from the Nukus Museum of Art.

Selected works

Academic

Translations

References

External links 
 Véronique Schiltz at the Académie des Inscriptions et Belles-Lettres

1942 births
2019 deaths
People from Châteauroux
Officiers of the Légion d'honneur
Members of the Académie des Inscriptions et Belles-Lettres
French art historians
Officers of the Ordre national du Mérite
Translators to French
Translators from Russian
French women archaeologists
20th-century translators
20th-century French women